Pterolophia multigibbulosa is a species of beetle in the family Cerambycidae. It was described by Maurice Pic in 1937.

References

multigibbulosa
Beetles described in 1937